Henri von der Weid (12 December 1893 – 24 April 1967) was a Swiss equestrian. He competed in three events at the 1924 Summer Olympics.

References

External links
 

1893 births
1967 deaths
Swiss male equestrians
Olympic equestrians of Switzerland
Equestrians at the 1924 Summer Olympics
People from Fribourg
Sportspeople from the canton of Fribourg